The Dream Calls for Blood is the seventh studio album by American thrash metal band Death Angel. It was released on October 11, 2013, via Nuclear Blast. The album sold 5,400 copies in the U.S in its first week of release and reached number 72 on the Billboard 200, marking the first time in Death Angel's history that they cracked the Top 100 on the American charts.

Background 
Guitarist Rob Cavestany described the album's title as "basically our motto" and further explained that:

The album features a guest guitar solo by the album's producer, Jason Suecof.

Reception 

The Dream Calls for Blood has been well received by critics. Writing for About.com, Neil Pretorius praised the album as "another triumph for a band that clearly still has a lot of gas left in the tank" and for "throw[ing] down the gauntlet to the thrash scene at large". AllMusic's Fred Thomas also praised the band for remaining a "powerhouse of tight and shiny thrash metal" this late in its career, observing that Death Angel "still sound visceral and hungry decades into their work, a rare case of a band getting sharper as it goes instead of mellowing". While Greg Pratt suggested in Exclaim! that the album's length was too long, he applauded the album's "super-tight rhythm section, killer guitar work and excellent vocals". Metal Forces' Neil Arnold noted that the album is a more "straight-laced" thrash album in contrast with the band's more experimental fare, which he claimed stands as "simple proof that Death Angel rules the thrash scene". Rich Dodgin from All About The Rock claimed the album is "An essential purchase for fans of thrash metal."

Track listing 
All music by Rob Cavestany, all lyrics by Mark Osegueda, except "Territorial Instinct / Bloodlust" music and lyrics by Rob Cavestany.

Personnel

Death Angel 
 Mark Osegueda – lead vocals
 Rob Cavestany – lead guitar, backing vocals
 Ted Aguilar – rhythm guitar, co-lead guitar on track 6, backing vocals
 Damien Sisson – bass
 Will Carroll – drums

Guest musicians 
 Jason Suecof – guitar solo on "Empty"

Production and art 
 Jason Suecof – production
 Jason Suecof and Rob Cavestany – engineering
 Ronn Miller – assistant engineering
 Eyal Levi and Rob Cavestany – additional engineering
 Ted Jensen – mastering
 Brent Elliot White – cover art
 Rob Kimura – CD layout design
 Nick Koljian – band photography

Release history

Charts

References 

2013 albums
Death Angel albums
Nuclear Blast albums
Albums produced by Jason Suecof